The Progressive Party was one of the two Spanish political parties that contended for power during the reign of Isabel II (reigned 1833–1868). It was to the left of the opposing Moderate Party but also characterised itself as liberal. Like the Moderate Party, it supported Isabel against the claims of the Carlists.

History
The party was established in 1834 as the extreme liberal opposition, during the regency of queen mother Maria Christina of the Two Sicilies; Queen Isabel was only three years old. It was the party of the exaltados, veinteañistas or progresistas, heirs of the Trienio Liberal ("liberal triennium") of 1820–1823, whereas the Moderate Party represented the doceañistas who traced their roots to the Spanish Constitution of 1812. The Progressives were the party of the National Militia, the jury trial, a secular state, and of national sovereignty and the broadening of the franchise under census suffrage. On this last matter, their position was somewhat milder than popular sovereignty, in that it did not necessarily call for the universal franchise.

Like their Moderate opponents, they supported the monarchy of Isabel II, particularly against the Carlist pretenders. Their political position, however, was repeatedly compromised as Maria Christina and later Isabela herself continually attempted to achieve a compromise with the Carlists.

The Progressive Party disintegrated gradually after the murder of its last leader, General Juan Prim, 1st Marquis of los Castillejos in 1870, splitting into the Constitutional Party, the Radical Democratic Party, and the Democratic Party. It wasn't formally dissolved, however, until the 1874 restoration of the monarchy.

See also
 Parties and factions in Isabelline Spain
 Trienio Liberal

References 

 
Liberal parties in Spain
Political parties established in 1834
Defunct political parties in Spain
1834 establishments in Spain